St Helens Women's Football Club was a leading women's football club in England.

The club was founded in 1976 by Chris Slater and Liz Deighan, who had met at trials for the England women's national football team.  It joined the Merseyside League, winning it three years running from 1978 to 1980, also winning the Merseyside Cup twice.  In 1979/80, it won the Women's FA Cup, defeating Preston North End 1–0 in the final.  This took them into the European Clubs Cup, and the team lost in the 1980/81 final.

The team then switched to the North West Women's League, winning the championship twice.  It reached the final of the Women's FA Cup again in 1980/81, 1982/83, and 1986/87, but lost on each occasion.  In later years, the club played in the Women's Premier League Northern Division, and the Midland Combination Women's Football League.  It was renamed as the Garswood Saints, and under that name won the North West Women's Regional Football League in 2004/05.

In 2006, there was a fire at the team's clubhouse, in Garswood, and this led the club to disband at the end of the 2005/06 season.

References

1976 establishments in England
2006 disestablishments in England
Defunct women's football clubs in England
Association football clubs established in 1976
Association football clubs disestablished in 2006
Football clubs in Merseyside
Sport in St Helens, Merseyside